Halicreas minimum is a species of deep sea hydrozoan of the family Halicreatidae. It is the only species in the monotypic genus Halicreas.

Description 
Umbrella 30–40 mm wide, thick, disk-like, with small apical projection; 8 clusters of gelatinous papillae above margin, mouth wide circular opening; 8 broad, band-like, radial canals; broad circular canal; gonads flattened, extending along almost entire length of radial canals; tentacles up to 640; 3-4 statocysts in each octant.

References 

Halicreatidae
Animals described in 1909
Monotypic cnidarian genera
Hydrozoan genera